The 1928 USC Trojans football team was an American football team that represented the University of Southern California in the Pacific Coast Conference (PCC) during the 1928 college football season. In their fourth season under head coach Howard Jones, the Trojans compiled a 9–0–1 record (4–0–1 against PCC opponents), outscored opponents by a total of 267 to 59, and won the PCC championship.

The AP Poll did not exist at the time. The only contemporaneous rating system was the Dickinson System which was released on December 8, 1928. USC and Wisconsin tied for the No. 1 spot. In addition to Dickinson, USC was recognized as the 1928 national champion by the Sagarin Ratings. Georgia Tech has been recognized as the national champion by the majority of later selectors.

Three USC players received honors on the 1928 All-America college football team: tackle Jesse Hibbs (first-team selection by Central Press Association and Newspaper Enterprise Association), center Nate Barragar (second-team selection by the Associated Press); and quarterback Don Williams (second-team selection by the North American Newspaper Alliance). Four USC players received first-team honors on the 1928 All-Pacific Coast football team: quarterback Don Williams (NEA-1, UP-1); fullback Lloyd Thomas (AP-1, NEA-1, UP-1); end Lawrence McCaslin (NEA-1); and center Nate Barragar (AP-1).

Schedule

References

USC
USC Trojans football seasons
College football national champions
Pac-12 Conference football champion seasons
College football undefeated seasons
USC Trojans football